John Karaspyros (born 9 March 1960) is an Australian former association football player, whose primary position was defender.

Playing career

Club career
Karaspyros played in for Sydney Olympic FC in the National Soccer League and Canterbury-Marrickville in the New South Wales State League.

International career
Karaspyros played one full international for Australia in 1978 against Greece in Sydney.

References

1960 births
Living people
Australian soccer players
Australian people of Greek descent
Australia international soccer players
Sydney Olympic FC players
Association football defenders